"Baby, Let's Lay Down and Dance" is a song recorded by American country music singer Garth Brooks.  It was released as the first single off Brooks' 2016 album, Gunslinger. The single was distributed exclusively via Brooks' online music store, GhostTunes, to users who entered a code from a specially marked bag of Fritos. It was then released to radio and GhostTunes' conventional site.

The song was written by Kent Blazy, Steve Dorff, Victoria Shaw, Kim Williams and Brooks.  Williams died before the song was finished, and as Williams was a longtime collaborator with Brooks, it was important to Brooks to release this song as the album's first single.

Charts

Weekly charts

Year-end charts

References

Songs about dancing
2016 singles
2016 songs
Garth Brooks songs
Songs written by Kent Blazy
Songs written by Garth Brooks
Songs written by Steve Dorff
Songs written by Victoria Shaw (singer)
Songs written by Kim Williams (songwriter)